Myrick is an English surname. Notable people with the surname include:

 Andrew Myrick (1832–1862), American frontier trader
 Bismarck Myrick (born 1940), American ambassador
 Bob Myrick (born 1952), American baseball player
 Daniel Myrick (born 1961), American film director
 Don Myrick (1940–1993), American saxophonist
 Gary Myrick (b. ? ), American singer, songwriter, and guitarist
 Gary B. Myrick (b. ?), U.S. Senate officer
 Hannah Myrick (1871–1973), American physician
 Jalen Myrick (born 1995), American football player
 Julian Myrick (1880–1969), American insurance salesman and tennis promoter
 Leland Myrick (b. ? ), American author and illustrator
 Marie Louise Scudder Myrick (1854–1934), American newspaper editor and publisher
 Nathan Myrick (1822–1903), American city founder
 Spencer Myrick (1918–1991), American politician
 Sue Myrick (born 1941), American politician
 Susan Dowdell Myrick (1893–1978), American journalist, educator, author, and conservationist
 Svante Myrick (born 1987), American mayor

See also
 Myrick (disambiguation)

English-language surnames